El Bordo is a town and municipality in Salta Province in northwestern Argentina.

The mayor Juan Rosario Mazzone, who is involved in controversy over alleged involvement with underage girls, has been impeached and removed from office. He was replaced by the mayor Matías Assennato, who also closed the city council.

References

Populated places in Salta Province